Little Rock is an incorporated city in Lyon County, Iowa, United States, along the Little Rock River. The population was 439 at the time of the 2020 census. The zip code for Little Rock is 51243.

Geography
Little Rock is located at  (43.442628, -95.883931).

Demographics

2010 census
As of the census of 2010, there were 459 people, 195 households, and 129 families living in the city. The racial makeup of the city was 99.8% White and 0.2% from other races. Hispanic or Latino of any race were 0.7% of the population.

There were 195 households, of which 27.2% had children under the age of 18 living with them, 56.9% were married couples living together, 7.2% had a female householder with no husband present, 2.1% had a male householder with no wife present, and 33.8% were non-families. 31.3% of all households were made up of individuals, and 15.4% had someone living alone who was 65 years of age or older. The average household size was 2.35 and the average family size was 2.95.

The median age in the city was 41.8 years. 24.6% of residents were under the age of 18; 7.7% were between the ages of 18 and 24; 22.3% were from 25 to 44; 23.9% were from 45 to 64; and 21.6% were 65 years of age or older. The gender makeup of the city was 48.4% male and 51.6% female.

2000 census
As of the census of 2000, there were 489 people, 208 households, and 133 families living in the city. The racial makeup of the city was 99.59% White and 0.41% Asian.

There were 208 households, out of which 23.1% had children under the age of 18 living with them, 60.1% were married couples living together, 2.4% had a female householder with no husband present, and 35.6% were non-families. 31.7% of all households were made up of individuals, and 22.6% had someone living alone who was 65 years of age or older. The average household size was 2.35 and the average family size was 2.98.

24.3% were under the age of 18, 6.3% from 18 to 24, 21.1% from 25 to 44, 22.3% from 45 to 64, and 26.0% were 65 years of age or older. The median age was 43 years. For every 100 females, there were 87.4 males. For every 100 females age 18 and over, there were 85.0 males.

The median income for a household in the city was $31,667, and the median income for a family was $38,571. Males had a median income of $26,000 versus $18,750 for females. The per capita income for the city was $15,514. About 4.3% of families and 9.6% of the population were below the poverty line, including 13.3% of those under age 18 and 10.8% of those age 65 or over.

Education
The community is served by the George–Little Rock Community School District, formed on July 1, 2003, by the merger of the George and Little Rock school districts. George–Little Rock Senior High School is the district's high school.

Notable person
Tyler Starr - linebacker, drafted 255th overall, in the seventh round of the 2014 NFL Draft by the Atlanta Falcons Monte Lee Kruse: American Photographer,
https://thereader.com/culture/farewell-mayor-of-old-market Mark Kruse District Judge https://www.iowacourts.gov/iowa-courts/district-court/judicial-district-8/district-8-judges-and-magistrates/mark-kruse/

References

Cities in Iowa
Cities in Lyon County, Iowa